Silvana Gardner (born 1942) is a writer and visual artist in Australia. Her art works are held in major art collections including the National Gallery of Victoria and the Queensland Art Gallery.

Selected poetry

Personal 
Born in Yugoslavia in 1942, Gardner migrated to Australia in 1951. She graduated from the University of Queensland with a Bachelor of Arts. Her papers are held in the Fryer Library at the University of Queensland.

References

Australian writers
Australian women artists
Living people
Place of birth missing (living people)
1942 births